Endozoicomonas elysicola is a Gram-negative, rod-shaped and strictly aerobic bacterium from the genus of Endozoicomonas which has been isolated from the gastrointestinal tract of the sea slug Elysia ornata from the coast of Izu-Miyake Island in Japan.

References

Further reading

External links
Type strain of Endozoicomonas elysicola at BacDive -  the Bacterial Diversity Metadatabase
 

Oceanospirillales
Bacteria described in 2007